Robert von Zimmermann or Robert Zimmermann (November 2, 1824, Prague – September 1, 1898, Prague) was a Czech-born Austrian philosopher.

The mathematician and philosopher, Bernard Bolzano, entrusted his unfinished work, Grössenlehre ("Theory of Quantity", a philosophical foundation for mathematics), which had not been completed at the time of his death in 1848, to von Zimmermann who was 24 years old. Zimmermann had been a student of Bolzano's. Since Zimmermann's interests were more in the area of philosophy as he had been appointed to the chair of philosophy at the University of Prague in 1852, he didn't do much with Bolzano's papers. Most of the remaining manuscripts stayed in Zimmermann's possession until 1882 when he gave them to the Austrian Academy of Sciences (Kaiserliche Akademie der Wissenschaften in Wien).

Robert von Zimmermann taught at the University of Vienna from 1861.  One of his doctoral students was Kazimierz Twardowski.

Literary works 
 Philosophische Propädeutik, 1852
 Geschichte der Ästhetik als philosophische Wissenschaft, 1858
 Allgemeine Ästhetik als Formwissenschaft (General Aesthetics as a Science of Form), 1865
 Studien und Kritiken zur Philosophie und Ästhetik, 2 vols., 1870
 Anthroposophie, 1882

References 

 Payzant, Geoffrey, "Eduard Hanslick and Robert Zimmermann: A Biographical Sketch", University of Toronto, 28 January 2001. (an earlier version delivered October 14, 1995 at a symposium on music and philosophy held at the University of Toronto)

Further reading 
 Johnston, William M., "The Austrian mind: an intellectual and social history, 1848-1938", University of California Press, March 1983. Cf. pp. 80, 152, 269, 289, 406, 454–455, various.

Czech philosophers
Austrian philosophers
Members of the Austrian Academy of Sciences
1824 births
1898 deaths